This is a list of fictional characters, main characters as well as some supporting characters from The Wallflower, a Japanese manga that was also adapted into an anime series and a live-action drama. The manga's plot focuses on Sunako Nakahara, a girl who was called ugly by the first boy she had a crush on and isolated herself from life, losing her sociability and care for her physical appearance. Four handsome boys, Kyouhei, Takenaga, Yuki, and Ranmaru must try to turn her into a lady to please her aunt, who is also their landlady, with the promise that they won't have to pay the rent if they succeed. However, their task is not made easy due to Sunako's depressive and gloomy nature and resistance to becoming a lady.

Main characters

Sunako Nakahara

Portrayed by Aya Ōmasa in live-action drama.

The main female protagonist of the series has an obsession with darkness and a morbid fascination with blood, horror movies, and other similarly dark things. After being rejected by her first love, she decided to abandon her femininity and become isolated from the world. She hates excessive light exposure and also does poorly in hot weather, though the latter is because she grew up in northern Japan. She has three "friends"; a skeleton called Josephine (with her husband, sergeant George) and two anatomical figures named Hiroshi-Kun and Akira-Kun. While she suffers from severely low self-esteem, she is quite beautiful (most of her physical imperfections are a result of her self-imposed isolation from the world) and is a frighteningly tough fighter, being able to lift someone twice her size with one hand. She is also surprisingly wise for someone her age and will give good advice to her friends (even if she doesn't realize it). She is shown to be quite blunt saying what is on her mind with no hesitation unless she is asking the "radiant beings" for a favor. She is portrayed (mostly) throughout the manga in chibi form as a sort of visual metaphor for how she and others see herself; only becoming full-sized and in proportion with the others when her mood becomes bold or confident. She is a very good cook, very athletic, intelligent, and a good pianist. She is also tall for an average Japanese teenage girl. She refers to beautiful people as "creatures of light" and "ugly" people, such as herself, as "creatures of darkness", in the American translation. Whenever she sees a "creature of light", she gets nosebleeds, and they're usually severe when she sees Kyohei (Though recent chapters have shown her having fewer nosebleeds in his presence). Despite her negative attitude, once she is driven to do something, Sunako is quite capable of doing things that no one expects her to complete. There is also a possibility that she may have supernatural abilities. For example, plants wilt near her and windows shatter.

Her relationship with Kyohei is somewhat unclear, as despite saying that she always wants to kill him, she often goes to an extent to protect him from his admirers and treat him well when he is down. In many of the recent chapters, she has not thought of or mentioned killing him, and though protests at first, doesn't greatly mind spending time with Kyohei, even giving him a homemade gift in the chapter "A Present for You" to remind him of the good memories he had with his mother. Recent chapters have also shown her forgetting her first crush and becoming more open to others, including her peers and teachers at school. She also thinks of her other housemates as more than just that, as stated in a previous chapter of the manga that she thought they were "closest friends." She is shown to be very protective of her friends even going to the point of trying to murder or kill the person who hurt them.

Kyohei Takano

Live-Action: Kazuya Kamenashi

The male protagonist of the series. While he says that all he cares about is getting free (or the lowest amount required to be paid) rent, he has a soft spot for Sunako and empathizes with her more so than the others. He is the most popular of the boys, and always has trouble keeping down a part-time job because his fans will chase after him, or his boss (male or female) will sexually harass him. Kyohei's personality in the series is often shown to be a fighter and a dangerous one. Kyohei is cocky, short-tempered, and the only one tough enough to fight on the same level as Sunako. He also tends to succumb to food and money. Since Sunako is the only girl who can understand his true personality regardless of his good looks, he gradually develops an obvious attraction towards her, despite being dense towards his feelings. In later chapters, he seems to be aware of his feelings to at least a small degree. He has a strained relationship with his mother because of the trouble his good looks brought to their household (with many girls bombarding their house with letters and phone calls for him), and was found by the Landlady on the streets where she brought him to the household to live. His hair is modeled after Tackey of Tackey & Tsubasa.

Takenaga Oda

Live-Action: Hiroki Uchi

The most intellectual of the four, Takenaga is called the "Boss" (a pun on his name in Japanese, which can be read as buchou, meaning "boss") by his friends and is the least fazed by Sunako's morbid habits. When the quartet dresses Sunako up, Takenaga is usually responsible for doing Sunako's hair. Takenaga was originally from a wealthy family descended from flower masters (ikebana), but when the pressure of being the family heir was too much, he became completely withdrawn and ignored everyone. He was sent to live at the Landlady's mansion in hopes of becoming more "normal". He is described as a caring feminist and is rather shy. He is currently going out with Noi, whom he affectionately calls "Noi-chi", it is also quite possible that he has a jealous personality. Shown in the manga where he thought he might lose Noi to another guy. His name is derived from Oda Nobunaga (in fact it was once suggested in the anime that Takenaga was a direct descendant of Nobunaga) and his reference to Noi as "Noi-chi" is probably a reference to Oichi, a sister of Nobunaga.

Yukinojo "Yuki" Toyama

Live-Action: Yuya Tegoshi

The most androgynous of the four, "Yuki" is gentle and is initially the most frightened of Sunako. He's the most "normal" of the four boys; before coming to live at the mansion he had a normal school life with a middle-class family. His mother and the Landladies are old friends and the Landlady, and Sunako at times has a soft spot for Yuki, which is shown in "A Girl's Bravo" when Sunako kicked out all the boys and only gave Yuki food. He's also the shortest and shyest, with a "cute" face, and has been called on (very reluctantly) to dress up as a girl on more than one occasion. He is usually responsible for choosing what sort of clothes Sunako wears when she is forced to dress up and has a good sense of fashion. He has a girlfriend named Machiko. He also has two younger siblings named Gin and Yae.

Ranmaru Morii

Live-Action: Shuntaro Miyao

A ladies' man, Ranmaru is often going out with various beautiful older (and often married) women. The very sight of Sunako initially has him breaking out in hives, but when her true beauty is revealed, he decides that she has "potential" to become a real lady. Like Takenaga, he comes from a wealthy family (who own a series of hotel chains) but was sent to live with the Landlady because he exploited his wealth and his parents wanted him to become normal. Surprisingly, Ranmaru is better at kendo than Takenaga, who comes from a traditional family. He apparently is the strongest advocate of making Sunako into a lady and is usually responsible for doing her make-up whenever she has to dress up; however, his attempts are rarely successful in the long run and he is convinced that it is Kyohei's attitude towards Sunako that is the primary problem. In hopes of changing his womanizing habits, his parents engage him with a reserved and conservative girl of their liking, named Tamao Kikunoi. Even though he rejects Kikunoi's love for him, he begins to develop feelings for her. He is named after the real-life Mori Ranmaru, the partner of Oda Nobunaga.

Supporting characters

Aunt Nakahara
 Live-Action: Reiko Takashima

Sunako's aunt (addressed as Oba-san or "Auntie"), who expects Kyohei, Takenaga, Yuki, and Ranmaru to make Sunako into a lady. Called the "infamous Marie Antoinette of the East", Miss Nakahara is extremely wealthy and usually travels unconventionally, such as in a fleet of helicopters. The Landlady is rarely around (usually in France with her latest boyfriend or fiancé) and the four males have managed to convince her that Sunako is on the fast track to becoming a lady when her niece is not. However, the Landlady has also been known to make unexpected visits, which often leads to the boys putting on an act of some sort with Sunako to make her appear more ladylike and, occasionally, resulting in raised rent when all does not go as planned.

The Landlady is the younger sister of Sunako's father and, like her niece, requires very little effort to frighten the boys. It is known that her husband is dead and the apparent reason why she keeps getting a new boyfriend is that she is lonely, but she loves none of these men in the same way she loved her husband. While their interaction is relatively limited, Sunako admires her aunt a great deal and considers her the most beautiful woman she knows; the Landlady, in turn, simply wants Sunako to be happy and believes that helping her niece become a lady will do so, especially since as a child Sunako always wanted to be like her aunt. She gradually turns her focus away from trying to shape Sunako into an elegant lady, believing that Sunako is perfectly capable of acting as such, and attempting to change Kyohei into a suitable partner for her niece. She is fluent in various languages like French, Russian, and Tagalog.

In the live-action series, her name is Mine Nakahara and she has a son.

Takeru Nakahara
Live-Action: Seishiro Kato

 is the Landlady's son and Sunako's cousin. Unlike most children his age, Takeru has a courageous personality (although he can be frightened as well). He only appears in the drama.

Noi Kasahara

Live-Action: Ranko Kobe

 is a very pretty and exceedingly popular girl who becomes Sunako's closest female friend at school. She loves being called beautiful by others, especially Sunako. She admires Sunako's tough attitude and is often very protective of her when someone insults her. She believes that Sunako and Kyohei are compatible as a couple. Noi is in love with Takenaga, though she tends to be insecure about their relationship because Takenaga is too shy to openly admit that he likes her. As stated in recent chapters, she's a fan of shoujo manga.

Hiroshi-Kun

Hiroshi-Kun is an anatomical figure, Sunako's most precious possession and best friend. Sunako often confides in him regarding her feelings about the boys and situations, although she does not get a reply. Despite not being alive, Hiroshi-Kun is treated as a living person, narrating the opening of each anime episode, and dancing during the anime's end credits. Hiroshi-Kun was found by Sunako in a pile of rubbish shortly after she was described as being ugly by her first crush, and she formed a bond with Hiroshi-Kun, both being "discarded" from the world.

Sunako takes good care of Hiroshi-Kun, along with her other anatomical friends (Josephine, Akira-kun, and Sergeant George). His fake organs have a habit of falling out or being removed by Sunako. The boys at first are dismissive of Sunako's relationship with Hiroshi-Kun, but eventually come to accept it over the course of the manga and anime, treating him the same way Sunako does but remembering that he is not alive. On several occasions, Hiroshi-Kun is kidnapped by other characters and held to ransom. These characters include The Boss so he could meet Sunako, and a trio of obsessive fan girls of Kyouhei, which results in Sunako risking life and limb to save Hiroshi-Kun.

Tamao Kikunoi

 is the fiancée of Ranmaru because of an arranged marriage by both their parents. She is extremely wealthy and studies at an all-girls school. Aside from hoping Tamao's calm demeanor will change Ranmaru's womanizing habits, both Ranmaru's parents are extremely fond of her and would like her to become their daughter-in-law. Her character is a perfect example of a "lady" as she foils Noi's loud mouth and Sunako's un-ladylike nature. In her first meeting with the boys, she is unfazed by any of their attempts to portray Ranmaru as a ladies' man or someone undesirable. Despite Ranmaru's playboy qualities, she has fallen in love with him, to the extent of admitting her feelings. His rejection of her does not faze her, hoping that eventually he would come to feel the same way.

Sebastian
Sebastian is the Landlady's butler, and is often seen when the Landlady returns to the mansion, often assisting in her schemes towards the four boys and Sunako. Despite her outwardly not showing it, the Landlady cares for Sebastian greatly, as seen when she gave him time off in care for his health, albeit in a roundabout way. Sebastian is shown to be very devoted to the Landlady, often putting up with her many extravagant actions, and when not service the Landlady, is shown to be at a loss over what to do. He has been serving the Landlady for a long while, and is presumed to have known her deceased husband as well.

Other characters

Sunako's parents
Sunako's parents live abroad, supposedly in Africa, and have left Sunako under the care of her aunt. The boys are not surprised to discover that Sunako's father is physically huge and not particularly attractive and are more worried about his protective streak towards his daughter, who became increasingly distant towards him and refused to let him into her room. He later discovers that his daughter still loves him; she just did not want him to see the inside of her room because it was filled with things that would horrify him. He has a bad back as a result of saving Sunako from a bear as a child.

Sunako's mother is a very attractive and petite woman, something that the boys did not expect from their knowledge of Sunako and her father's appearances. She is surprisingly strong and is able to lift her husband off the ground effortlessly. She thinks nothing of Sunako's morbid habits as long as they make her happy and she scolds Sunako's father for pleading for Kyohei to change Sunako into a normal girl. A flashback reveals that Sunako's mother is actually younger than most women with daughters of Sunako's age.

Sunako's classmates
Sunako's classmates initially both fear her terrifying demeanor and scorn her association with the four boys. However, after she wins an athletic competition for their class, they come to respect and admire her, though they remain somewhat frightened of her more morbid habits. In addition, Sunako becomes popular with the cooking club for her domestic abilities and they frequently ask her to join them when they are trying new recipes. Her classmates include a trio of girls named Nana, Nene, and Nono who are friendliest with her.

Machiko
Machiko is Yuki's girlfriend. In chapter 55, she moved to Florida, where it was shown that Yuki got jealous over a photo she took with an American, and vows to become more of a gentleman himself, which unfortunately resulted in a misunderstanding between the two. In more recent chapters, she has moved back to Japan, and is often seen going on dates with Yuki - though both Yuki and Machiko are afraid the other thinks their dates are to kiddish, though both come to realize they are just right for the pair. She is also seen in recent chapters as Yuki's date when the four guys go out to events (along with Noi, Tamao, and an often unwilling Sunako).

Goth-Loli Sisters

Yvonne: Laseine: Madeleine: Roxane: 

Initially their roles in the storyline were much smaller, but were expanded within the anime to provide comic relief. They usually have a cameo appearance in each episode saying their catch phrase "Goth-Goth, Loli-Loli" while crossing their own fingers. A notable aspect to their characters is that instead of actively pursuing their crushes, they instead sit in the background and waited for them to notice them instead. Their appearance is an exaggeration of the Gothic Lolita phenomenon, and are very unattractive. Their names are given as Ierie, Machapi, Maririn and Mintan in the Singaporean English-language translation.

The Prince of Grimel
He first appears in chapter 79. The prince's parents, the king and queen of Grimel (a fictional European country), invites Sunako to their country, who brings the four guys along with her. There, it was discovered that the king and queen hoped to marry their son, the prince, to Sunako. The prince shares a love of horror and darkness with Sunako, and falls in love with her. Sunako was enchanted with the purportedly haunted forests and crypts of Grimel and unknowingly accepted the proposal. However, on the day of the wedding, Kyohei took Sunako away as he was sick of European food and wanted to eat Japanese food. Sunako has since not reinstated the proposal, but the prince has continued to pursue Sunako, studying Japanese horror stories such as the famous Yotsuya Kaidan.

The "Boss"

The self-proclaimed "head of the National Boss Association", a street gangster from Kumagoroshi who falls for the SD Sunako, much to the surprise of everyone surrounding him. Originally, he wanted to challenge Kyohei to a fight to see who was stronger, but later changed it to a fight for Sunako's affections, believing that Kyohei was Sunako's boyfriend. He can be seen in both the manga and the anime version. In the anime, his name is given as Hiromi Hanayashiki.

Yuki
Yuki is Sunako's friend in Hokkaido, who is revealed early on to be a descendant of Yuki-onna. Due to her heritage, Yuki has powers over ice and snow, as shown when she accidentally freezes Yukinojo (who is also coincidentally nicknamed "Yuki") with a handshake. Her powers also seem to be connected to her emotions, as a blizzard almost formed when she started crying. Despite Yuki's selfish reasons for inviting Sunako (which was to take pictures of her male companions and sell them to get a gift for her boyfriend), it is shown that the two do care for one another as Yuki considers Sunako her only friend and Sunako doesn't want to see Yuki get hurt and cry.

Ginshiro and Yae
Gin and Yae are Yuki's two younger siblings, who have a fond attachment to Yuki. Because Yuki left the house during their younger ages, he was not often around them as they were growing up, and is shown to want to be a big brother to them now, despite often accidentally causing misunderstandings with them because of this. Yae is also shown to have a fondness of Sunako, while Ginshiro shares Yuki's same fear of Sunako's horror items.

Kyohei's mother
Kyohei's mother appears in chapter 37, when Kyohei's father takes Sunako to Kyohei's childhood home. As Kyohei's popularity in his hometown often caused a lot of problems for their household, Kyohei's mother developed a slight hatred for her son, often breaking down in his presence and yelling at him. She is insecure about her looks (a combination of her husband often being away for work and Kyohei's own blinding beauty), and as a result, having Kyohei around only worsened her insecurity, which lead to Kyohei leaving home.

Works cited
 "Ch." and "Vol." are shortened forms for chapter and volume and refer to the appropriate sections in The Wallflower manga by Tomoko Hayawaka.
 "Ep." is short for episode and refers to The Wallflower anime.
 "Drama Ep." is short for episode and refers to Yamato Nadeshiko Shichi Henge drama series.

References

External links
 http://www.comicvine.com/sunako-nakahara/4005-57504/

Wallflower
The Wallflower (manga)